Thurmont is a town in Frederick County, Maryland, United States. The population was 6,935 at the 2020 census. The town is located in the northern part of Frederick County (north of Frederick, the county seat), approximately ten miles from the Pennsylvania border, along U.S. Highway 15. It is very close to Cunningham Falls State Park and Catoctin Mountain Park, the latter of which contains the presidential retreat of Camp David. Thurmont is also home to Catoctin Colorfest, an arts and crafts festival that draws in about 125,000 people each autumn.

In 2005, Thurmont was designated as a Maryland Main Street Community and in 2005 Thurmont was designated a National Main Street under the National Trust for Historic Preservation.

History

Name change 
Originally incorporated as the Town of Mechanicstown in 1751, the name of the town was changed to Thurmont by an act of Maryland General Assembly on January 18, 1894. This name change was due to several other nearby towns having similar names, such as Mechanicsburg, Pennsylvania and Mechanicsville, Maryland. Charles E. Cassell, editor of the local newspaper Catoctin Clarion was the one to suggest the name Thurmont and promoted debate about the name change in the Clarion. Some of the names considered included Beaufort, Eastmont, Glenmont, Monduru, Fern Glen, and Blue Point. Eventually, the options were pared down to two main contenders: Cassell's suggestion of Thurmont, and local real estate broker Charles Shipley's suggestion of Blue Mountain City, which he argued was "appropriate" and "pretty" during an address at a town meeting in December 1893. In the December 14, 1893 issue, the Clarion printed the following: "The name is a misnomer: it is harshness long drawn out; it is an antique minus the lacquer; the sentimentalism that cries out against a change lacks its correlative, poetry, and smacks of the catacombs; its prestine [sic] glory is effaced by the ruthless circumstance of immigration to improve condition; an hundred, yea, hundreds of grandsons now recount to strangers in other States how their grand-fathers drove a thriving trade in factory, forge and mill in Mechanicstown and then confess--Ilium fuit; Delenda est Carthago! [Troy is no more; Carthage must be destroyed!]"

By the end of December 1893, there had been several rounds of voting, and Thurmont had been officially chosen as the town's new name. The Clarion noted, however, that "the reception of a letter from the Postoffice Department saying that the name 'Blue Mountain City' would not be approved by the Department as there is an office called 'Blue Mountain' in the State, probably defeated the choice of that name."

The name Thurmont is derived from thur, the German word for gateway or entrance, and mons, the Latin word for mountain, roughly translating to "Gateway to the Mountains."

Railroads 

The Western Maryland Railway built its main railroad through Thurmont, connecting the town with Baltimore, and later with Hagerstown and Cumberland. On June 17, 1905, 16 men from Thurmont were killed in a railway wreck in Ransom, Maryland when a westbound freight train collided head-on with another train. All Thurmont businesses were closed on the Monday following the accident, and it became an event that had a lasting effect on the entire community. Another large railway accident occurred on June 25, 1915 when the Blue Mountain Express train hit another train head-on just west of Thurmont, killing 6 people. Charles Eyler, who was 17 years old at the time of the crash, said the following: "People were still wondering the next day how the two engines had stayed on the rails. But it was easy to see how the wreck had occurred. The bridge is 'blind' from both directions."

Geography 

Thurmont is located at the eastern foothill of the Catoctin spur of the Blue Ridge Mountains.

Thurmont is located at  (39.624974, -77.410245).

Climate 
The climate in this area is characterized by hot, humid summers and generally mild to cool winters.  According to the Köppen Climate Classification system, Thurmont has a humid subtropical climate, abbreviated "Cfa" on climate maps.

Transportation
The primary method of travel to and from Thurmont is by road. U.S. Route 15 is the main highway serving Thurmont, providing connections northward to Gettysburg, Pennsylvania and southward to Frederick. Maryland Route 806 follows portions of the old alignment of US 15 through the center of Thurmont, with the main highway now following a bypass on the west side of town. Maryland Route 77 is the main east-west highway traversing the town, which provides connections eastward towards Keymar and westward towards Smithsburg. MD 77 also provides access to Catoctin Mountain Park. One other highway, Maryland Route 550, provides access northwestward towards Fort Ritchie and southeastward to Woodsboro.

Demographics 

The median income for a household in the town was $49,530, and the median income for a family was $56,138. Males had a median income of $37,804 versus $27,266 for females. The per capita income for the town was $20,474. About 4.0% of families and 6.1% of the population were below the poverty line, including 8.3% of those under age 18 and 5.8% of those age 65 or over.

2010 census 
As of the census of 2010, there were 6,170 people, 2,354 households, and 1,701 families residing in the town. The racial makeup of the town was 95.8% White, 1.0% Black, 0.4% Native American, 0.6% Asian, 0.7% from other races, and 1.5% from two or more races. Hispanic or Latino of any race were 2.4% of the population.

There were 2,354 households, of which 36.7% had children under the age of 18 living with them, 56.9% were married couples living together, 11.3% had a female householder with no husband present, 4.1% had a male householder with no wife present, and 27.7% were non-families. 22.3% of all households were made up of individuals, and 9.3% had someone living alone who was 65 years of age or older. The average household size was 2.62 and the average family size was 3.08.

The median age in the town was 39.5 years. 25.8% of residents were under the age of 18; 7.2% were between the ages of 18 and 24; 26.3% were from 25 to 44; 27.7% were from 45 to 64; and 13.1% were 65 years of age or older. The gender makeup of the town was 48.4% male and 51.6% female.

Name change referendum

Notable people
 Richard Troxell, opera singer
 Russell R. Waesche, Commandant of the U.S. Coast Guard
 Neal Coty, country music singer

References

External links 

 
 myThurmont.net  Thurmont Community Website
 The News-Journal  Thurmont Community Newspaper
 "Thurmont Scrapbook" – History articles from Greater Emmitsburg Area Historical Society
 "ThurmontFirst" The Thurmont Economic Development and Main Street web site featuring the online business directory, business news, events and photo albums.
 "The R. S. Kinnaird Collection of Historic Thurmont Images" A collection of over 4,200 images of Thurmont and surrounding communities.
 

Towns in Maryland
Towns in Frederick County, Maryland